The 2019 Qatari Stars Cup was the ninth edition of Qatari Stars Cup. 

The tournament featured 12 teams divided into 2 groups.

Round One Groups

Standings

Group A

Results

Group B

Results

Knockout round

Quarter-finals

Semi-finals

Final

References

Qatari Stars Cup
Qatari Stars Cup
Qatari Stars Cup